Donald Cole may refer to:

Donald Cole (anthropologist) (born 1941), American anthropologist
Donald Cole (painter), American abstract painter
Donald B. Cole (1922–2013), American historian
Donald Cole (basketball) (born 1981), American basketball player

See also
Donald Coles, English footballer